The Testament of Isaac is a work now regarded as part of the Old Testament apocrypha. It is often treated as one of a trio of very similar works, the other two of which are the Testament of Abraham and Testament of Jacob, though there is no reason to assume that they were originally a single work. All three works are based on the Blessing of Jacob, found in the Bible, in their style.

Content 
The Testament of Isaac has heavy Christian themes, though the Christian elements are usually regarded as later additions to what was originally a purely Jewish work. The Testament begins with Isaac being told of his impending death by an angel, and his message to his son in response. Isaac here is portrayed as foretelling both the Twelve Tribes of Israel and Jesus, the latter being a later Christian addition to the text. When a crowd assembles, Isaac gives a sermon about harmonious behaviour, as well as instruction on how to confess. 

At this point, the angel returns and takes Isaac to heaven, first seeing the torture of sinners (occurring in heaven and not in some underworld hell according to the author), and then meeting the deceased Abraham. At this point Isaac is not quite dead, and so returns to earth, and on the instruction of Abraham, writes down his Testament, and then dies and returns to heaven in a flying chariot, much like Abraham in his Testament.

See also 

 Testaments of the Three Patriarchs

References 

Isaac
Apocrypha
1st-century books
2nd-century books
Old Testament pseudepigrapha
Jewish apocrypha
Apocalyptic literature
Texts in Koine Greek
Roman Egypt